Helmut Herbst (2 December 1934 – 9 October 2021) was a German film director, producer and screenwriter. He directed 16 films between 1963 and 1998. His 1982 film Eine deutsche Revolution was entered into the 32nd Berlin International Film Festival.

Selected filmography
 Eine deutsche Revolution (1982)

References

External links

1934 births
2021 deaths
German directors
Film people from North Rhine-Westphalia
People from Oberbergischer Kreis